Carlos Blanco Galindo (12 March 1882 – 2 October 1943) was a Bolivian general who served as the 32nd president of Bolivia on a de facto interim basis from 1930 to 1931.

Carlos Blanco was born in Cochabamba, Bolivia. A career military officer and a lawyer, Blanco was one of the leaders of the insurrection that toppled from power Hernando Siles, who had attempted to extend his term in office in view of the grave challenges posed by the onset of the Great Depression and other looming political crises. Unable to impose his will, Siles resigned and left his cabinet collectively in charge; it was this "Silista" cabinet that was, in fact, overthrown by the coup led by Blanco (in alliance with the parties opposed to Siles) in late June 1930.

Blanco's term was short and rather simple; his main task was to call new elections, which took place within seven months of his swearing-in. In every other matter, he seemed to defer to his rather capable technocratic Cabinet, led by Daniel Sánchez Bustamante (1871–1933) – the grandfather, incidentally, of future president Gonzalo Sánchez de Lozada. Upon the election, and assumption of office, of Daniel Salamanca, General Blanco was named Ambassador to Uruguay, but returned briefly to the active service upon the eruption of the Chaco War with Paraguay (1932–35). He would later write a number of books.
 
Blanco died in Cochabamba in October 1943.

References

1882 births
1943 deaths
20th-century Bolivian politicians
Ambassadors of Bolivia to the Holy See
Ambassadors of Bolivia to Uruguay
Bolivian male writers
Bolivian military personnel
Defense ministers of Bolivia
Leaders who took power by coup
People from Cochabamba
People of the Chaco War
Presidents of Bolivia
Honorary Knights Grand Cross of the Order of the British Empire